Tom Robinson Band (TRB) are a British rock band, established in 1976 by singer, songwriter and bassist Tom Robinson. The band's debut single "2-4-6-8 Motorway" was a top five hit on the UK Singles Chart  in 1977, and their third single, "Up Against the Wall", is seen by some as a classic punk rock single; while their debut album, Power in the Darkness (1978), is regarded as a definitive late-1970s punk album. Their song "Glad to Be Gay" is considered a British national gay anthem.

History
Tom Robinson began gigging in London in 1976. By the end of the year, he had decided to put together a permanent band. Robinson's old friend, guitarist Danny Kustow, was the first in the permanent lineup. They ran small ads in the music papers looking for a bass player and drummer. Robinson found drummer Brian "Dolphin" Taylor. 
The search for a bass player continued, until Mark Ambler auditioned. Some days later, Ambler mentioned he also played keyboards; he had spent many years studying piano with veteran jazz musician Stan Tracey. After listening to Ambler playing his Hammond organ Robinson realised he would have to be the bass player himself.

The band hit the club scene right in the middle of London's punk explosion. Their live shows got favourable reviews, and soon A&R men were attending many of their gigs.

EMI Records signed the Tom Robinson Band (TRB). Robinson later described this period, saying "Within nine months we'd made the transition from signing on at Medina Road dole office to Top of the Pops, Radio One, EMI Records and the giddy heights of the front cover of the New Musical Express".

TRB made leaflets and fliers about their political views and sent them to everyone who attended their gigs. They gave away badges and made up T-shirts emblazoned with the band's logo and they appeared regularly at Rock Against Racism concerts. They were joined at these gigs by the likes of The Clash, Steel Pulse and X-Ray Spex.

"2-4-6-8 Motorway" was their first single, released in late 1977, which got into the top five of the UK singles charts and stayed there for over a month. It was followed almost immediately by their next record, a four-song EP called Rising Free, which was recorded live at London's Lyceum Theatre in November 1977. It contained the songs "Don't Take No for an Answer", "Martin", "(Sing if You're) Glad to Be Gay" and "Right on Sister". The EP reached No. 18 in the UK singles charts.

In early 1978, TRB recorded their debut album, Power in the Darkness. The UK version of the LP contained all new songs, but in the US (on the Harvest label), the "2-4-6-8 Motorway" single and Rising Free record were combined for a six-track bonus EP that made the album almost a double.

Change in lineup
Power in the Darkness reached number 4 in the UK album charts and won the band a gold record, and TRB were voted "Best New Band" and "Best London Band" for the year 1977 by listeners at the Capital Radio Music Awards. Keyboardist Mark Ambler left the band after recording the first album. Session pianist Nick Plytas was drafted in as a temporary replacement, and played with TRB at a major Anti-Nazi League rally in London's Victoria Park early that year.

Keyboardist Ian Parker joined as a permanent replacement for Ambler. TRB then went to Rockfield Studios in Wales to record their next album, TRB Two. Chris Thomas, who had produced their first album, was also at the control deck for their second album, to start off with. Drummer Dolphin Taylor suggested Todd Rundgren should replace Thomas. After not being able to decide which tracks should appear on the LP, the band eventually agreed to let Rundgren choose. However, he picked two of the songs Taylor particularly disliked, and Taylor decided that he would leave rather than play on the tracks. A day later he had calmed down somewhat and offered to return, but Robinson refused, and Preston Heyman was recruited as an emergency stand-in. His picture was included on the album cover, but there was never any intention for him to join the band permanently. Taylor's eventual replacement was Charlie Morgan who had played for Kate Bush, and went on to drum for Elton John for a further fifteen years.

To support the album's release, the band went on tour, but by this point the TRB's infighting had taken its toll. When guitarist Kustow decided to quit in 1979 that was the end of TRB. Their last two gigs were in Torhout and Werchter, Belgium in 1979.

In 1989, Robinson, Kustow and Ambler put together a reunion tour with Steve Creese on drums. They played sold-out shows at the Marquee Club in London and went on for the best part of a year before splitting again.

Discography

Albums

Studio

Live

Compilations

Singles and EPs

Notes:
1 Includes post-TRB material.
2 Released as "Tom Robinson & the Voice Squad".

See also
 :Category:Songs written by Mark Ambler
 List of British punk bands
 List of musicians in the first wave of punk music
 List of new wave artists and bands
 List of Peel sessions
 Music of the United Kingdom (1970s)
 List of performers on Top of the Pops

References

External links
https://www.academia.edu/33834154/_PDF_full_text_What_Can_Political_Rock_Do_A_Discussion_Based_on_the_Example_of_the_Tom_Robinson_Band_in_the_1970s Analytical article on TRB and political rock
https://web.archive.org/web/20050725074101/http://www.tomrobinson.com/trb/

English punk rock groups
English new wave musical groups
Musical groups from London
Musical groups established in 1976
LGBT-themed musical groups
Harvest Records artists
1976 establishments in England